Jonathan Myerson Katz (born 1980) is an American journalist and author known for his reporting on the 2010 Haiti earthquake and the role of the United Nations in the ensuing cholera outbreak.

Background and education 
Katz was born in Queens, New York and grew up in Louisville, Kentucky. 

He graduated from Northwestern University with a bachelor of arts in history and American studies in 2002, and with a master's degree in journalism from the Medill School of Journalism in 2004. During his undergraduate years, he was a reporter, editor, and cartoonist for The Daily Northwestern.

Career

Early career and Associated Press 
Katz began working as a reporter while in graduate school at Medill; his assignments included covering the Pentagon for Lee Enterprises at the start of the Iraq War. He reported for the Associated Press as an intern while stationed in Jerusalem during Second Intifada in fall 2003. In 2004, Katz worked at Congressional Quarterly as a committees reporter. The following year, he joined the AP's Washington Bureau, where he reported that Senate Majority Leader Bill Frist (then the frontrunner for the Republican presidential nomination) had sold all his stock in his family's hospital corporation immediately before the price dropped. Katz moved to the Dominican Republic to be AP correspondent in 2006, and then to Port-au-Prince, Haiti in October 2007. His major stories for the AP during this time included articles on the 2008 food crisis and riots, the 2008 Pétion-Ville school collapse, election fraud, and hurricanes and tropical storms ravaging the country.

2010 Haiti earthquake, aftermath and cholera 
Katz was the only full-time American correspondent in Haiti when the 2010 Haiti earthquake struck on January 12, 2010. Katz, then 29, was on the second floor of his rented house in the Pétion-Ville neighborhood when the swaying started at approximately 4:45 p.m. He rushed outside barefoot as his house collapsed, borrowed a cell phone on the street, and became the first to report the earthquake; the alert he sent out hit the newswire at the same time as the U.S. Geological Survey's initial report of the quake. In an unusual move for a wire service, the AP ran Katz's first-person account of surviving the quake the next day. In the months after the earthquake, Katz stayed in Haiti to report on the country's recovery and issues with the delivery of foreign aid, specifically from the U.S.

That fall he reported that UN peacekeepers were the likely cause of a post-quake cholera epidemic that had led to the deaths of at least 6,600 people. The UN refused for three months to allow an independent investigation. Among the pressures cited by observers as leading to the UN's reversal was Katz's reporting, which according to a medical journalist "spread almost instantly around the world, irrevocably reframing a massive health crisis and probably changing international policies for years to come". After Katz obtained an internal report condemning the Secretariat for its lack of accountability, the UN admitted having played a role in the outbreak in 2016.

Katz won the 2010 Medill Medal for Courage in Journalism for his reporting on the earthquake and its aftermath. He also received a National Headliners Award and was a finalist for the Livingston Award and Michael Kelly Award for the "fearless pursuit and expression of truth".

Later career 
Katz reported in Mexico during the drug wars. He was an AP editor until leaving the organization in 2012 to write The Big Truck that Went By (published 2013). 

He has become a regular contributor to The New York Times, where he has covered topics such as U.S. police violence and the 2015 murders of Muslim students in Chapel Hill, North Carolina. Katz's work has also appeared in The New Republic, The Guardian, Foreign Policy, Politico, and The New Yorker website, with a grant from the Pulitzer Center on Crisis Reporting, as well as The New York Times Magazine.

The Racket 
Katz began authoring a newsletter on Substack entitled, The Racket. It asserts that it is dedicated to examining "[t]he unseen connections behind international affairs, disaster, politics, and more". 

Its September 7, 2022 edition that was edited by Tommy Graggs is entitled, You can't fight fascism without a little partisanship. It addresses what Katz determined to be faulty criticism of the speech President Joe Biden delivered in Philadelphia on September 1 regarding the "battle for the soul of the nation" and Katz responded directly to several critics who labeled the speech as, "partisan".

Books 
The Big Truck That Went By was shortlisted for the PEN/John Kenneth Galbraith Award for Non-Fiction. It won the 2013 Cornelius Ryan Award for "the best nonfiction book on international affairs", given by the Overseas Press Club of America. Katz received the J. Anthony Lukas Work-in Progress Award, given to support the completion of "significant works of nonfiction", and the resulting book was a finalist for the J. Anthony Lukas Book Prize, awarded by the Columbia School of Journalism and Harvard's Nieman Foundation to significant works of nonfiction. The Big Truck That Went By also won the 2013 WOLA-Duke Human Rights Book Award, given annually by the Washington Office on Latin America and Duke University to honor nonfiction books focusing on human rights, democracy, and social justice in contemporary Latin America.

His second book, Gangsters of Capitalism: Smedley Butler, the Marines, and the Making and Breaking of America's Empire, was published in January 2022. It traces the life of Major General Smedley Butler, including his role in foiling the Business Plot to overthrow President Roosevelt, and the long-term consequences of the wars in which Butler fought; to document how he is remembered in the locations of those wars, Katz interviewed Haitian workers and Chinese martial artists and played a bit part in a film in the Philippines.

Awards

For The Big Truck That Went By 
 Shortlisted for the PEN/John Kenneth Galbraith Award for Non-Fiction
 Barnes & Noble "Discover Great New Writers" Selection
 2012 J. Anthony Lukas Work-in-Progress Award "to aid the completion of a significant work of nonfiction" from Columbia Graduate School of Journalism and Nieman Foundation for Journalism at Harvard and finalist for 2014 J. Anthony Lukas Book Prize
 2013 WOLA-Duke Human Rights Book Award for his contribution to the public's understanding of human rights, democracy, and social justice in contemporary Latin America.
 2013 Overseas Press Club of America Cornelius Ryan Award for the "best nonfiction book on international affairs".

For reporting 
 2010 Medill Medal for Courage in Journalism
 Finalist for 2011 Michael Kelly Award
 2011 National Headliner Award, 1st Place News Beat Coverage
 2011 and 2009 SPJ Deadline Club of New York Awards
 Finalist for Livingston Award for International Reporting by journalists under 35 in 2009 and 2014

References

External links 
 Official website
 
 AP interview after Haiti earthquake 
 AP interview on first anniversary of quake
 ABC interview on first anniversary of quake 
 2011 Medill Medal for Courage in Journalism award lecture at Northwestern University, Part I, Part II
 Speech at Overseas Press Club Awards

1980 births
Living people
American male journalists
American non-fiction writers
American investigative journalists
People from Queens, New York
Writers from Louisville, Kentucky
Northwestern University alumni
Medill School of Journalism alumni
Associated Press reporters
Journalists from New York City